Kaila may refer to:

People with the surname Kaila:
 Eino Kaila (1890-1958), Finnish philosopher, critic and teacher
 Erkki Kaila (1867–1944), Finnish theologian, Archbishop of Turku
 Lauri Kaila, Finnish entomologist and researcher of biodiversity
 Osmo Kaila (1916–1991), Finnish chess master

People with the given name Kaila:
 Kaila Charles (born 1998), American basketball player
 Kaila Holtz (born 1981), Canadian softball pitcher
 Kaila McKnight (born 1986), Australian athlete
 Kaila Methven (born 1994), American fashion designer
 Kaila Mullady (born 1993), American musician
 Kaila Murnain, Australian politician
 Kaila Story (born 1980), African-American podcaster
 Kaila Yu (born 1979), Taiwanese-American singer-songwriter

Other:
Chinese e-zine Kaila (开啦), edited by actress and director Xu Jinglei

See also
 Kaila (genus), an insect genus in the tribe Empoascini
 Cala
 Kaila devi
 Kala
 Kayla
 Kila
 Kíla
 Kyla (given name)

Finnish-language surnames